Lichtenegger is a surname. Notable people with the surname include:

Donna Lichtenegger (born 1956), American politician
Elmar Lichtenegger (born 1974), Austrian hurdler
Norbert Lichtenegger (born 1951), Austrian former footballer
Vatroslav Lichtenegger (1809-1885), Croatian composer
Mathilde Mallinger, born Lichtenegger

German-language surnames
Surnames of Austrian origin